Eduardo Ramos (born May 28, 1966 in Mechongué, near Necochea, Buenos Aires province) was an Argentine racing driver. He won the Turismo Carretera championship in 1994.

References

1966 births
Argentine racing drivers
Turismo Carretera drivers
Sportspeople from Buenos Aires Province
TC 2000 Championship drivers
Living people